Jason Farris Brown (born August 27, 1969) known professionally as Colt Ford, is an American singer, rapper, songwriter, entrepreneur, and former professional golfer best known for his music fusing the country and rap genres. He has released seven albums via Average Joes Entertainment, which he co-founded. Ford has charted six times on the Hot Country Songs charts and co-wrote (with Brantley Gilbert) "Dirt Road Anthem", a song on his 2008 album Ride Through the Country, which Jason Aldean later covered on his My Kinda Party album. Ford was the first, and so far only, artist to have a Number One album on Billboard Top Country Albums and Top Rap Albums.

Biography
Brown was born and raised in Athens, Georgia. He was a professional golfer, playing on the Nationwide Tour. Later, he turned his interests to music, taking influence from country music and hip hop. Assuming the stage name Colt Ford, he released his debut album, Ride Through the Country, on December 2, 2008, through Average Joes Entertainment, which he cofounded. This album included the singles "No Trash in My Trailer" (a cover of a Mike Dekle/Byron Hill song) and "Ride Through the Country" (a duet with John Michael Montgomery), the latter of which did not chart until the week of October 10, 2009, when it debuted at number 57 on Hot Country

He also appeared on a rap remix of Montgomery Gentry's late-2008 Number One single "Roll with Me". Ford's debut album also has guest appearances from country singer Jamey Johnson, as well as Bone Crusher and Jermaine Dupri, Adrian Young of No Doubt, and Jeremy Popoff of Lit. The album did not enter the Billboard albums charts until 2009.

Ford co-wrote and originally recorded the song "Dirt Road Anthem" for his debut album Ride Through the Country; it was later released by Brantley Gilbert, who co-wrote the song, on his 2010 album Halfway to Heaven, and again by Jason Aldean on his album My Kinda Party, also from 2010.

Ford wrote the theme song "Buck 'em" for the Professional Bull Riders association. He also appears as a guest vocalist on the track "Tailgatin'" on Cledus T. Judd's 2009 album Polyrically Uncorrect, a song which Ford wrote with Johnson and Popoff. Ford's second studio album, Chicken & Biscuits, was released in April 2010, following the release of its title track.

Ford released a third studio album on May 3, 2011, called Every Chance I Get. The album's lead-off single, "Country Thang", debuted at number 55 for the country chart week ending February 19, 2011. "She Likes to Ride in Trucks", featuring Craig Morgan, served as the album's second single.

Ford's fourth album, Declaration of Independence, became his first number 1 album on Top Country Albums. Its first charted single is "Back", a duet with Jake Owen. "Back" is Ford's highest charting single to date, making Top 40 on Hot Country Songs. In 2012, Colt Ford headlined the Declaration Of Independence Tour with supporting acts The Lacs, Lenny Cooper, and JB and the Moonshine Band. In the fall of 2012 Ford announced he would be touring with JJ Lawhorn on the Answer To No One Tour.

Colt Ford's fifth studio album, Thanks for Listening, was released on July 1, 2014.

"4 Lane Gone" is the first single from his sixth studio album, Love Hope Faith. Ford released a music video for the single on September 11, 2016 Love Hope Faith was released on May 5, 2017.

Colt's next album "We the People, Volume 1" was released in September 2019.

Discography 

 Ride Through the Country (2008)
 Chicken & Biscuits (2010)
 Every Chance I Get (2011)
 Declaration of Independence (2012)
 Thanks for Listening (2014)
 Love Hope Faith (2017)
 We the People, Volume 1 (2019)

Awards and nominations

References 

1969 births
American country singer-songwriters
American male rappers
American male golfers
Average Joes Entertainment artists
Country musicians from Georgia (U.S. state)
Country rap musicians
Living people
Musicians from Athens, Georgia
Rappers from Georgia (U.S. state)
Georgia (U.S. state) Republicans
21st-century American rappers
21st-century American male musicians
American male singer-songwriters
Singer-songwriters from Georgia (U.S. state)